Eristalis fraterculus, the black-spotted drone fly, is a species of hoverfly with a holarctic distribution. It flies from early June to late October, and occurs in tundra and taiga.

References

Eristalinae
Taxa named by Johan Wilhelm Zetterstedt
Insects described in 1838